Antony Siaha (born June 19, 1993) is a Cameroonian footballer who plays as a goalkeeper for Monterey Bay FC.

Career

Early professional career 
Siaha spent his early professional career playing as the primary backup for three different San Diego clubs in three different leagues. He first signed with San Diego 1904 for the 2020 NISA season. After that he made the switch to indoor soccer and joined the San Diego Sockers for their 2021 MASL season. When Siaha signed for the Sockers, it was believed that he was the tallest goalkeeper at that point in MASL history, though he did not make an official appearance for the indoor club. He departed the Sockers to join San Diego Loyal for their 2021 USL Championship season.

Monterey Bay 
On May 20, 2022, Siaha officially left San Diego Loyal and joined USL Championship expansion side Monterey Bay. He had initially trialed with the club before being signed. On July 10, 2022, Siaha made the first start of his professional career in his debut for Monterey Bay. He contributed to a shutout in a 2-0 win away to Orange County SC. Siaha earned Team of the Week honors for his performance. The next week he repeated a shutout against fellow USL Championship expansion Detroit City in Monterey Bay's first ever scoreless draw. Siaha would go on to have a total of eight clean sheets in his seventeen appearances for the 2022 season. This would him Monterey Bay's Golden Glove award for the season. Prior to the 2023 season Siaha signed a contract extension with Monterey Bay for two more seasons.

References 

1998 births
Living people
Association football goalkeepers
Cal State Bakersfield Roadrunners men's soccer players
Cameroonian expatriate footballers
Cameroonian expatriate sportspeople in the United States
Cameroonian footballers
Expatriate soccer players in the United States
Monterey Bay FC players
San Diego Loyal SC players
USL Championship players